Louise Olivia Violet Edwards (born 21 November 1978) is a Canadian astronomer and assistant professor of physics at California Polytechnic State University (Cal Poly), and is one of the first Black Canadians to receive a PhD in astronomy. In 2002, she was pictured on a Canadian stamp.

Early life, education and research 

Louise Edwards grew up in Victoria, British Columbia, Canada. She completed her undergraduate degree in physics and astronomy, with a minor in mathematics, at the University of Victoria. She received a master's degree from St Mary's University in 2003, and a PhD from Université Laval in 2007. She studies galaxy formation and evolution using optical and infrared spectroscopy, X-ray photometric data, and radio wavelength observations, focusing on Brightest Cluster Galaxies, galaxies in cluster cores, and galaxies in filaments.

Career 
Following her doctoral studies, Edwards was a postdoctoral research scientist at Caltech/IPAC and Trent University, and then an assistant professor at Mount Allison University. From 2012 to 2016, Edwards was a lecturer and research scientist in the astronomy department at Yale University, before starting her faculty position at Cal Poly in 2016. During her time at Yale, she was the chair of the Dorrit Hoffleit Undergraduate Research Fellowship program for undergraduate research in Astronomy.

In the media 

 CBC program celebrating Black History Month
 The Deep Sky: From Near to Far. Essays in the 2013–2020 editions of the RASC Observer's Handbook
 Astronomy at Yale (Yale Astronomy Department Documentary)
 This black hole has an appetite for cold, cosmic rain
 Astronomy in Color (interview)
 Research note: An illuminating look at large galaxies and their closest companions
 Leitner Family Observatory and Planetarium at Yale
 Blog Downtown LA
 Boomerang-shaped galaxy sighted 
 Astronomers Probe "Sandbar" Between Islands of Galaxies
 International School for Young Astronomers
 Canadian Astronomical Society Newsletter I

References

Living people
21st-century Canadian astronomers
California Polytechnic State University faculty
Canadian people of African-American descent
21st-century Canadian women scientists
1978 births
Black Canadian scientists
Université Laval alumni